Ralf Vandebergh (born 1976) is a Dutch astronomer, professional photographer and veteran satellite spotter from Nijswiller. He is known for photographing the Sun, Moon, planets, satellites, NASA Space Shuttles, and the International Space Station from Earth using a telescope-mounted camera.

Biography
His work is widely published in the media.

On 10 April 2009, NASA featured one of his images as its "Astronomy Picture of the Day". An October 2011 image he took of the  defunct German telescope ROSAT was published by various media outlets, including the Washington Post, The New York Times and Fox News. In 2011, Vandebergh captured images of the Russian interplanetary probe Fobos-Grunt, which became stuck in low Earth orbit after communications failure.

Photographs

References

External links 
Recent articles by Vandebergh at Space Safety Magazine
Website Ralf Vandebergh

1976 births
Living people
21st-century Dutch astronomers
21st-century Dutch photographers
People from Gulpen-Wittem